The boys' halfpipe event in freestyle skiing at the 2012 Winter Youth Olympics in Innsbruck, Austria, was held on 14 and 15 January at Kühtai. 13 athletes from 13 different countries took part in this event.

Results

Qualification
The qualification was held on 14 January at 13:15.

Final
The final was held on 15 January at 13:40.

References 

Freestyle skiing at the 2012 Winter Youth Olympics